Jeanne Georgette Edmée Vaussard (19 December 1891 – 24 February 1977) was a French tennis player.  She who competed in the Olympic games in 1920 and 1924 and reached the finals of the French Championships in 1924, losing to Julie Vlasto.

World Championships finals

Doubles (1 title, 1 runner-up)

References

External links
 

1890s births
1977 deaths
French female tennis players
Olympic tennis players of France
Tennis players at the 1920 Summer Olympics
Tennis players at the 1924 Summer Olympics